Opostega cretatella is a moth of the family Opostegidae. It was described by Pierre Chrétien in 1915. It is known from Algeria.

Adults have been recorded in April.

References

Opostegidae
Moths described in 1915
Endemic fauna of Algeria
Moths of Africa